Audioshield is a rhythm game created by Dylan Fitterer for the HTC Vive. The game generates levels based on music supplied by the player. The player blocks incoming "notes" with a shield of matching color.

Gameplay 
The player uses the HTC Vive's handheld motion sensing controls to operate two shields, colored blue and orange. The player uses these shields to block incoming orbs of the corresponding color. Sometimes the player must block purple orbs by holding both of the shields together.

The level generation is done in a similar way to Fitterer's previous Audiosurf series. The user supplies the song, and the game generates a series of orbs to match the beat of the song. Songs can be stored locally, and they could run through YouTube Streaming before YouTube blocked this feature as it violated its license policy.

Reception 

Audioshield got generally favorable reviews from critics, with an 81/100 score on Metacritic. Some praised Audioshield for its innovative approach to the music game genre, while others opined that the game lacked replayability, even with a large variety of songs.

References

External links 
 Official website

2016 video games
HTC Vive games
Indie video games
Single-player video games
Video games developed in the United States
Windows games
Windows-only games